KLE University's College Of Pharmacy (KLESCOPH) is private institute for higher education in pharmacy in Hubli, Karnataka, India. It was established in 1985 by the KLE Society.

Accreditation
KLESCOPH College is affiliated under Rajiv Gandhi University of Health Sciences, (RGUHS) Karnataka. All Programs (Bachelor of Pharmacy, Master of Pharmacy and Doctorate) are approved by All India Council of Technical Education, an accreditation agency for higher education.

Ranking

KLE University's College Of Pharmacy was ranked 37 in the National Institutional Ranking Framework (NIRF) pharmacy ranking 2020.

References

External links
 

Pharmacy schools in India
Universities and colleges in Hubli-Dharwad
Colleges affiliated to Rajiv Gandhi University of Health Sciences
Educational institutions established in 1985
1985 establishments in Karnataka